The "At Home" day was a social custom in Victorian Britain, where women of gentle status would receive visitors on a specific day of the week.

The woman would print calling cards indicating she would be "At Home" e.g. on "Fridays in April". Those of her acquaintances who had received the card could then call on her that day. It was considered impolite to visit unannounced on any other day, or to visit without having received a card. Guests should visit between three or four and six in the afternoon, and stay for a period from a quarter of an hour to an hour, depending on the level of intimacy with the hostess.

British colonies
The custom of "At Home" days was also observed in the British colonies, such as in Wellington, New Zealand. Here the tradition served to uphold barriers between the different social classes among the colonists.

The telephone
The invention and proliferation of the telephone –  facilitating the planning of visits on a shorter notice –  did much to make away with the convention of "At Home" days.

World War I
It was made further obsolete when, in World War I, many women immersed themselves in the war effort; and, in doing so, largely ignored many previously held social obligations.

A further consequence of the war was that economic scarcity made domestic servants less common, a trend that made the old calling system impractical.

Literary examples
Suffragist Evelyn Sharp used the term in her 1897 short story "The Other Anna", where the heroine liberates herself by turning her back on the "At Home" day:

It is also mentioned in George Bernard Shaw's 1913 play Pygmalion, where it is held by the mother of the protagonist Henry Higgins:

In Edith Nesbit's 1899 novel The Story of the Treasure Seekers, the phenomenon of the "At Home" day is used to express social differences:

References

See also 

 Office hours

Social networks